Virgibacillus salexigens is a species of Gram-positive bacteria.

Taxonomy
This species was formerly contained by the genus Salibacillus and before that by Bacillus. Strains of this species were originally isolated from salterns and saline soil samples in Spain. They are spore-forming, slightly aerobic, and moderately halophilic.

References

Further reading

External links
Type strain of Virgibacillus salexigens at BacDive -  the Bacterial Diversity Metadatabase

Bacillaceae
Bacteria described in 2003